USS Chicago (SSN-721) is a , the fourth ship of the United States Navy to be named for the city of Chicago, Illinois. The contract to build her was awarded to Newport News Shipbuilding and Dry Dock Company in Newport News, Virginia on 13 August 1981 and her keel was laid down on 5 January 1983. She was launched on 13 October 1984 sponsored by Mrs. Vicki Ann Paisley, wife of Melvyn R. Paisley assistant Secretary of the Navy, and commissioned on 27 September 1986.

History
Early in 1996, an RQ-1 Predator aerial reconnaissance drone was successfully controlled from Chicago. The drone reached altitudes up to 6,000 meters (20,000 ft) and ranged up to 185 kilometers (100 nmi.) from the submarine, which was operating at periscope depth.

In the summer of 2005, Chicago tested the virtual periscope, a system that would allow submerged submarines to observe the surface above them without having to come to a shallower depth, as is required by traditional periscopes.

After completing a two-year maintenance and upgrade period at Pearl Harbor Naval Shipyard in October 2011, Chicago arrived in April 2012 at her new homeport, assigned to Submarine Squadron 15, based at Joint Region Marianas on the island of Guam.

In keeping with a tradition that dates back to World War II, Richard O'Kane's cribbage board was transferred from 's Wardroom to Chicagos when Olympia was decommissioned on 31 October 2019, making Chicago the oldest fast attack boat in the Pacific Fleet.

Chicago arrived at Puget Sound Naval Shipyard on 17 January 2023 for her months-long inactivation and decommissioning process.

Awards
Chicago has earned multiple awards in her service life. Chicago has been awarded many unit awards, including the Navy Unit Commendation, three Meritorious Unit Commendations and four Navy "E" Ribbon Submarine Squadron Battle "E"s.

Chicago has also been awarded several campaign and service awards, including the Navy Expeditionary Medal, National Defense Medal, Armed Forces Expeditionary Medal, two Southwest Asia Service Medals, three Sea Service Ribbons, Kuwait Liberation Medal (Saudi Arabia), and the Kuwait Liberation Medal (Kuwait).

One of the barracks buildings at the US Navy's Recruit Training Command, Great Lakes is named "USS Chicago".

In popular culture
Chicago plays a prominent role in Tom Clancy's novel Red Storm Rising.
Chicago is also featured prominently in the 2008 naval thriller, Black Sea Affair, by Don Brown.
Chicago, alongside its former Sixth Fleet sister, USS Dallas, appear in the seventh mission of the 2009 video game, Call of Duty: Modern Warfare 2, titled "The Only Easy Day... Was Yesterday".

References

Further reading
 Chicago (Submarine (nuclear-powered) : SSN-721), and Newport News Shipbuilding and Dry Dock Company. Chicago Launching of SSN721, October 13, 1984. Newport News, Va: Newport News Shipbuilding, Tenneco Co, 1984. 
 Chicago (Submarine (nuclear-powered) : SSN-721). Welcome Aboard, USS Chicago SSN 721. United States: s.n, 1993. 
 Genat, Robin and Genat, Robert. Modern U.S. Naval Submarines. Osceola, WI: MBI Publishing Company, 1997.

External links

 Commander Submarine Force, U.S. Pacific Fleet
 721 Club – Civilian Support Organization for the Crew of SSN 721

Los Angeles-class submarines
Cold War submarines of the United States
Nuclear submarines of the United States Navy
1984 ships
Submarines of the United States
Ships built in Newport News, Virginia